Daniel Epps is a professor of law at Washington University in St. Louis. Epps teaches first-year criminal law, upper-level courses in criminal procedure, and a seminar on public law theory. His scholarship has appeared in the Harvard Law Review, the Yale Law Journal, the Michigan Law Review, and the NYU Law Review, and his writing for popular audiences has appeared in the New York Times, the Washington Post, Vox, and The Atlantic. His and Ganesh Sitaraman's proposal to expand the size of the Supreme Court was endorsed by Mayor Pete Buttigieg during his run for the 2020 Democratic Presidential nomination. His and William Ortman's proposal to create a "Defender General" for criminal defendants at the Supreme Court was the subject of an article in the New York Times.

Supreme Court Experience 
Epps is a nationally recognized expert on the Supreme Court. An experienced Supreme Court litigator, he served as co-counsel for the defendant in Ocasio v. United States, 136 S. Ct. 1423 (2016), which addressed the scope of criminal conspiracy liability for public-sector extortion. His other notable prior work includes the successful petition for certiorari and merits briefing in Walden v. Fiore, 133 S. Ct. 1493 (2014); a brief for the Court-appointed amicus curiae in Millbrook v. United States, 133 S. Ct. 1441 (2013); and an amicus brief for criminal law and procedure scholars in United States v. Davila, 133 S. Ct. 2139 (2013). He also served as co-counsel on the brief of Prof. Stephen E. Sachs as amicus curiae in Atlantic Marine Construction Co. v. U.S. District Court, 134 S. Ct. 568 (2013) (with Jeffrey S. Bucholtz & Stephen E. Sachs), which The Green Bag Almanac & Reader included on its list of “Exemplary Legal Writing” for 2013.

Publications 
Articles & Essays

 "Designing Supreme Court Term Limits," 95 Southern California Law Review__(forthcoming) (with Adam Chilton, Kyle Rozema & Maya Sen)
 "Checks and Balances in the Criminal Law," 73 Vanderbilt Law Review 1 (2021) 
 "The Defender General," 168 University of Pennsylvania Law Review 1469 (2020) (with William Ortman)
 "How to Save the Supreme Court," 129 Yale Law Journal (2019) (with Ganesh Sitaraman)
 "Harmless Errors and Substantial Rights," 131 Harvard Law Review 2117 (2018)
 "The Lottery Docket," 116 Michigan Law Review 705 (2018) (with William Ortman)
 "Adversarial Asymmetry in the Criminal Process," 91 New York University Law Review 762 (2016)
 "One Last Word on the Blackstone Principle," 101 Virginia Law Review Online 34 (2016)
 "The Consequences of Error in Criminal Justice," 128 Harvard Law Review 1065 (2015)
 Note, "Mechanisms of Secrecy," 121 Harvard Law Review 1556 (2008)

Selected Commentary

 "The Supreme Court is Leaking. That's a Good Thing." 'Washington Post' (Aug. 3, 2020)
 "Abolishing Qualified Immunity Is Unlikely to Alter Police Behavior," 'New York Times (June 16, 2020)
 "One Change That Could Make American Criminal Justice Fairer," 'The Atlantic' (Mar. 16, 2020) (with William Ortman)
 "How to Save the Supreme Court," Vox (Oct. 10, 2018) (with Ganesh Sitaraman)
 "Police Officers Are Bypassing Juries to Face Judges," Washington Post (Sept. 21, 2017)
 Contributor, “An Annotated Constitution," New York Times Magazine (July 2, 2017)
 "In Health Care Ruling, Roberts Steals a Move from John Marshall’s Playbook," The Atlantic (June 28, 2012)

Podcasts

Epps co-hosts Divided Argument with law professor William Baude on which they discuss recent Supreme Court decisions.

Epps previously co-hosted First Mondays with law professor Ian Samuel on which they discussed events at the Supreme Court.

Awards and honors 

 Honorable Mention, Scholarly Papers Competition, American Association of Law Schools (2018) (for The Lottery Docket)
 Finalist, Junior Scholars Paper Competition, Criminal Justice Section, American Association of Law Schools (2016) (for Adversarial Asymmetry in the Criminal Process)
 Exemplary Legal Writing, The Green Bag Almanac & Reader (2013) (for Brief of Professor Stephen E. Sachs as Amicus Curiae, Atlantic Marine Construction Co. v. U.S. District Court, 134 S. Ct. 568 (2013) (as co-counsel with Jeffrey S. Bucholtz & Stephen E. Sachs)

References 

Living people
Year of birth missing (living people)
American lawyers
Washington University in St. Louis faculty
Duke University alumni
Harvard Law School alumni